El man es Germán is a Colombian comedy-drama television series created by Juan Manuel Cáceres for RCN Televisión. The series is a spin-off of the Colombian telenovela Las detectivas y el Víctor. The plot focuses on the fun situations that punk rock Germán Quintero (Santiago Alarcón), and his friends and family live on a daily basis. The series original aired from 20 December 2010 to 6 February 2012. On 1 October 2018 it was confirmed that the series would be revived for a four-season, which premiered on 20 May 2019, and ended on 20 December 2019.

Series overview

Cast 
 Santiago Alarcón as Germán
 Marcela Gallego as Doña Grace
 Carlos Camacho as Marcelo Cantor
 Heidy Bermúdez as Jasbleidy
 Aida Bossa as Patty
 Santiago Rodríguez as Calixto
 Santiago Reyes as Frito
 Jesús David Forero as Jonathan
 Alberto Saavedra as Don Eugenio Gonzales
 Bárbara Pérea as Doña Pina
 Jenny Vargas as Lady
 Inés Prieto as Tía Yolanda Santos
 Diana Belmonte as Kassandra
 Omar Murillo as Bolo 8
 Rafael Zea as Maicol Giovanni
 Javier Eduardo Peraza as Bulto e sal
 Julián Arango as Don HP
 Laura Hernández as Britney
 Marcela Posada as Sandra Patiño
 Fabián Mendoza as Edil-Berto
 Miltón Lópezarrubla as Cónsul
 Katherine Castrillón as María Dolly
 Andrés Ruíz as Orteguita
 Biassini Segura as Rómulo

References

External links 
 

2010 Colombian television series debuts
Spanish-language television shows
Colombian television series
RCN Televisión original programming
2019 Colombian television series endings